Thomas Ryum Amlie (April 17, 1897 – August 22, 1973) was a U.S. representative from Wisconsin, elected to Congress as a member of the Republican Party from 1931 to 1933 and again from 1935 to 1939 as a member of the Wisconsin Progressive Party.

Biography
Born on a farm near Binford, North Dakota, Amlie went to the Cooperstown, North Dakota high school and then to the University of North Dakota and University of Minnesota. Amlie received his law degree from University of Wisconsin Law School and practiced law first in Beloit, Wisconsin and then in Elkhorn, Wisconsin.

In October 1931, Amlie was elected as a Republican to represent Wisconsin's 1st congressional district in the 72nd United States Congress, replacing Henry A. Cooper who had died in office, and served until March 1933. He then switched to the Wisconsin Progressive Party, an alliance established in 1934 between the longstanding "Progressive" faction of the Republican Party of Wisconsin, led by the La Follette family and their political allies, and certain radical farm and labor groups active in Wisconsin at the time  He was reelected on the party ticket to the 74th and 75th United States Congresses and served from January 3, 1935, till January 3, 1939.

From 1936, Amlie and the WPP were informally allied with the New Deal coalition and supported the reelection of President Franklin Roosevelt. After Amlie left Congress in 1939, the President nominated him to the Interstate Commerce Commission, but Amlie asked that the nomination be withdrawn.

In 1938, Amelie served on a committee for the defense of Fred Beal. Returned from the Soviet Union, Beal was facing recommittal in North Carolina where in 1929 as a union organiser he had been convicted in a conspiracy trial. He had been deserted by the Communist-controlled International Labour Defense because of the witness he was now bearing to the realities of Soviet collectivization. Serving with Amlie on the committee were Homer Martin of the UAW, Democrat Jerry Voorhis; the sociologist and pacifist Emily Greene Balch, the New York attorney and feminist Dorothy Kenyon and the poet Sara Bard Field. The Committee reported hostile pressure from members of the ILD and anonymous threats.

Returning from Washington DC, Amlie resumed the practice of law in Madison, Wisconsin, where he resided until his death August 22, 1973. Through his brother Hans, he was the brother-in-law of Milly Bennett.

Notes

External links

1897 births
1973 deaths
People from Griggs County, North Dakota
University of Wisconsin Law School alumni
Wisconsin lawyers
Wisconsin Progressives (1924)
Republican Party members of the United States House of Representatives from Wisconsin
Progressive Party (1924) members of the United States House of Representatives
20th-century American politicians
People from Elkhorn, Wisconsin
20th-century American lawyers